The cabinet of prime minister Ahmed Maiteeq was confirmed on 25 May 2014. 83 of the 94 MPs present voted to confirm the cabinet. Four cabinet positions remained unfilled. The election of the prime minister was declared illegal on 9 June 2014 by the Libyan Supreme Court.

Maiteeq government

References 

Cabinet, Maiteeq
Cabinet, Maiteeq
Cabinet, Maiteeq
Libya, Maiteeq Cabinet
Libya, Maiteeq Cabinet
2014 establishments in Libya
Second Libyan Civil War